Eleanor H. Whittemore (December 27, 1926 – April 1, 2022) was an American politician.

Whittemore was born in Hollis, New Hampshire, and worked with the Brookdale Fruit Farm. She received her associate degree in accounting from Daniel Webster College. Whittemore served one term in the New Hampshire House of Representatives from 1983 until 1985 and was a Republican.

References

1926 births
2022 deaths
People from Hollis, New Hampshire
Businesspeople from New Hampshire
Women state legislators in New Hampshire
Republican Party members of the New Hampshire House of Representatives